John Brimmer Tobacco Warehouse is a historic tobacco warehouse located at Lancaster, Lancaster County, Pennsylvania. It was built about 1901, and is a three-story, rectangular brick building with a stone foundation and flat roof.  It is four bays wide and approximately 148 feet deep.

It was listed on the National Register of Historic Places in 1990.

References

Industrial buildings and structures on the National Register of Historic Places in Pennsylvania
Industrial buildings completed in 1901
Buildings and structures in Lancaster, Pennsylvania
Warehouses on the National Register of Historic Places
Tobacco buildings in the United States
National Register of Historic Places in Lancaster, Pennsylvania